Alexander Lawton Mackall (May 23, 1888 in Chestnut Hill, Philadelphia, Pennsylvania – March 26, 1968 in West New Brighton, Staten Island, New York) was an author, journalist and gastronomy expert and critic. 

He was the editor of several New York City magazines and the author of the renowned restaurant guide Knife and Fork in New York (1948), a precursor of the Zagat's Survey. He had a strong connection to the Portuguese culture, being made an official of the Ordem de Cristo, a Portuguese honorific order that distinguishes personalities in the field of culture. Through The Lawton Mackall Foundation, incorporated in New York, he instituted a monetary prize to be awarded to the best students of a selected set of high schools in Portugal.

Main works
A Perfect Fool, Everybody’s Magazine, August 1925
Bizarre (illustrated by Lauren Stout), Lieber & Lewis, New York, 1922.
Black Jitney, The Century, March 1916
Broadway’s Poet Laureate, Everybody’s Magazine, Janeiro 1926
Clair de Loony, Zest, Janeiro 1927Hum and Grow Rich, Colliers, June 20, 1925Knife and Fork in New York, Doubleday, New York, 1949;Light Breakfast, The Century, April 1916Poodle Oodle of Doodle Farm (with Ruth Mackall);Portugal for Two, 1931;Scrambled Eggs, Stewart & Kidd Company, Cincinnati, 1920;Scrambled Eggs, The Smart Set, June 1915The Creeping Fingers, The Century, October 1915The Man with the Hose, The Century, September 1915The Night of the Fleece, The Century, August 1915The Restaurateur's Handbook (with Charles A. Faissole), 1938.

References
Louis C. Mackall, A Short History the Mackall Family'', New York, 1946.

External links
The Mackall Family of Calvert County, Maryland
Bizarre, by Lawton Mackall
Lawton Mackall scholastic prize
 
 

American male journalists
American magazine editors
1968 deaths
1888 births